The Senckenberg Nature Research Society (until 2008 Senckenbergische Naturforschende Gesellschaft) is a German scholarly society with headquarters in Frankfurt am Main.

Overview

Its purpose is to conduct research in the natural sciences and make the results of nature research available to the public. The society was founded by Frankfurt citizens on 22 November 1817 on the initiative of Johann Wolfgang von Goethe, and is named for the physician, naturalist, botanist and philanthropist Johann Christian Senckenberg (1707–1772).

The Senckenberg Nature Research Society owns several research institutes and museums, such as the Naturmuseum Senckenberg and the Naturkundemuseum Görlitz.

See also
Archiv für Molluskenkunde, one of its academic journals

References

External links
Senckenberg Nature Research Society

Organisations based in Frankfurt
History of Frankfurt
Biology societies
Leibniz Association